Peg bread is a traditional Jamaican and West Indian bread type. It is usually served along with tea in the morning.

See also

 Rye bread
 Coco bread
 Hard dough bread
 List of Jamaican dishes
 Rock cake

References

Jamaican cuisine
Caribbean cuisine
Jamaican breads